Awlam was a Palestinian village  south of Tiberias situated on the slopes of the westward Wadi Awlam.

History
Awlam is identified as Oulamma, an important town that existed during the Roman era of rule in Palestine.

Ceramics from the Byzantine era have been found here.

The Crusaders referred to it as Heulem. In 1144 the tithes of the village was given to the bishop of Tiberias. In 1174, the Bishop conceded its tithes to the church of Mount Tabor.

Ottoman era
Awlam was incorporated into the Ottoman Empire in 1517, and by 1596 it was a village under the administration of the nahiya ("subdistrict") of Tiberias, part of the sanjak of Safad. The village had a population of 12 households and 3 bachelors, an estimated  83 persons, all Muslims.  They paid  a fixed tax-rate of 25%  on wheat, barley, goats, and beehives, in addition to occasional revenues; a total of 3,409  Akçe.

A map by Pierre Jacotin  from Napoleon's invasion of 1799 showed the place, named as El Awalem.

In 1838 it was noted as a  village, 'Aulam, in the Tiberias District.

In 1859 there were 120 souls in the village, and the cultivation was 14 feddans, according to the British consul Rogers. However, when Victor Guérin visited in 1875, he described the village as “abandoned”. He further noted;

“Ancient materials are plentiful there. I noticed in particular a number of  column stumps and various fragments of sculptures coming from some building now destroyed. A church, converted later into a mosque, then into a stable, is quite well preserved. It had been built with alternately white and black stones, the former limestone, the latter basalt. On the lintel of the main entrance door one may observe, in the centre, a small circle, which formerly enclosed a cross, today completely effaced. Inside, some column shafts are lying on the ground, with their capitals broken.

In 1882, it was described as an agricultural village of 120, built of adobe bricks.  The Ottomans built an elementary school in this time period.

A population list from about 1887 showed  Aulam to have  about  575  inhabitants;  all Muslims.

British Mandate era
The 'Arab al-Muwaylhat Bedouin tribe settled in the village by the time Awlam was a part of the British Mandate of Palestine. The village had a mosque, but its school was closed down.

In the 1922 census of Palestine,  Ulam had a  population of 496; 487 Muslims, 8 Jews and 1 Christian, where the one Christian was of the Orthodox faith.  The population had  increased to 555 in the  1931 census, all Muslims, in a total of  139 houses.  The villagers  cultivated grain, figs, grapes, and pomegranates. They drew their drinking and domestic water from six different springs.

By the 1945 statistics, the village population was 720 Muslims,  and the total land area was  18,546  dunums of land.   360 dunams  were irrigated or used for orchards,   11,139 used for  cereals,  while 28 dunams were classified as built-up (urban) land.

1948, and aftermath
During the 1948 Arab-Israeli War, Awlam's villagers were ordered to leave on April 6, 1948, by the Arab Higher Committee who feared they might aid "Zionist forces". But the Haganah states that its Golani Brigade entered the village on May 12, and the inhabitants fled upon their arrival. Awlam became the final village in the eastern Lower Galilee emptied of its Arab inhabitants. According to Walid Khalidi, "nothing remains of the village buildings except stone rubble; only a spring that was used by the villagers has been left unchanged".

References

Bibliography

External links
Welcome To 'Awlam
'Awlam,   Zochrot
Survey of Western Palestine, Map 9: IAA, Wikimedia commons

Arab villages depopulated prior to the 1948 Arab–Israeli War
District of Tiberias